Little Robbers is the RIAA Gold-certified fourth studio album by new wave band the Motels. It was recorded between February and August 1983 and released on September 16 of that year.

It features the hit song, "Suddenly Last Summer", which hit No. 1 on Billboard's Album Rock Tracks chart, and became the band's second Top 10 Pop hit in the US, reaching No. 9 on the Billboard Hot 100.

Track listing

Singles

Charts

Personnel
Credits are taken from the CD's liner notes.

The Motels
Martha Davis – vocals, rhythm guitar
Guy Perry – lead guitar
Marty Jourard – keyboards, saxophone
Michael Goodroe – bass
Brian Glascock – drums, percussion
Scott Thurston – keyboards, guitar

Additional personnel
Steve Goldstein – keyboards
Craig Krampf – drums
Craig Hull – guitar
Chris Page – additional synthesizer
F. Bob Getter – bass
Waddy Wachtel – guitar
Jerry Peterson – saxophone

Production
Credits are taken from the CD's liner notes.
Produced and recorded by Val Garay
Assisted by Richard Bosworth
Mastered by Doug Sax
Art direction and design by Kosh and Ron Larson
Photography by Bob Blakeman

Notes

References

1983 albums
The Motels albums
Capitol Records albums
Albums produced by Val Garay